Robinson High School may refer to:

 Canada
M.M. Robinson High School — Burlington, Ontario
 Turks and Caicos Islands (United Kingdom)
 HJ Robinson High School — Cockburn Town, Grand Turk Island
 United States
Jay M. Robinson High School — Concord, North Carolina
Joe T. Robinson High School — Little Rock, Arkansas
Robinson High School (Illinois) — Robinson, Illinois
Robinson High School (Texas) — Robinson, Texas
Robinson Secondary School — Fairfax County, Virginia
Thomas Richard Robinson High School — Tampa, Florida